Kristen Meadows is an actress who has appeared in such daytime TV soap operas as One Life to Live as Mimi King and Santa Barbara as Victoria Lane.

Personal life 
Meadows was born in Milwaukee, Wisconsin. She comes from a family of performers and started her stage career in musicals. When she was 12, she has got a leading role in musical directed by her grandfather (a conductor). After graduating from high school, she studied at the American Academy of Dramatic Arts. Later she was a model for Wilhelmina Models Agency, did commercials, and became a TV and movie actress. In 1981, she made her Broadway debut in the play Fearless Frank.

Meadows was engaged with English designer Paul Stanley Lewis, but their wedding was canceled. On 16 July 1988, Meadows married a television director by the name of Bill Sheridan, but they were soon divorced. She had a romance with her Santa Barbara co-star Frank Runyeon, then started a relationship with Dr. David Kipper. Their son Sam was born in December 1989.

Meadows received death threats from fans over the way she played Victoria Lane, and she knew that she was not popular with Eden and Cruz fans, so Meadows left Santa Barbara in 1989.

Filmography
 Zero Tolerance (1994) as agent Megan
 Evolution (2001) as Patty

Television

Theatre 
 Hits Of Broadway
 South Pacific
 Pippin as Catherine
 The Rocky Horror Picture Show as Janet
 Kismet
 Hair
 Fiddler on the Roof
 The Sound of Music as Liesel

References 

American television actresses
Actresses from Milwaukee
Living people
1957 births
American stage actresses
21st-century American women